Aade (or Ade) is very small village in Ratnagiri district of Maharashtra, India. It is well connected & exactly in between Kelshi and Anjarle.

Specialities
Aade is famous for the ancient temple of Lord Parshurama called Bhargavram. Every year on the occasion of Akshay Trutiya (अक्षय तृतीया) Aadekars gather together to celebrate the Bhargavram Yatra. Similar to Kelshi, Aade coastline is also covered by the small sand dune. As per the historical records and evidences, the said sand dune is actually a result of tsunami hit which was formed around the time of Vasco da Gama's visit to India somewhere in the 15th century.

Climate
Weather is very humid. The winters are very cold.

Transportation
From Mangaon on Bombay Goa highway 10km towards Goa take the right turn at Lonere Phata for the road towards Shriwardhan.
From Dapoli, take the way towards Anjarle, cross the crick bridge and 4km to reach to Aade on the road towards Kelshi.

References 

Villages in Ratnagiri district
Talukas in Maharashtra